Arvid Lindberg (18 October 1902 – 8 March 1958) was a Norwegian footballer. He played in seven matches for the Norway national football team from 1924 to 1927.

References

External links
 

1902 births
1958 deaths
Norwegian footballers
Norway international footballers
Place of birth missing
Association footballers not categorized by position